The 2020 Kyrgyzstan Cup is the 29th season of the Kyrgyzstan Cup, the knockout football tournament in Kyrgyzstan. The cup winner qualifies for the 2021 AFC Cup.

The draw of the tournament was held on 24 September 2020, based on the 2020 Kyrgyz Premier League final positions. The seven teams which finished second to eighth in the league will participate. Dordoi, which finished first in the league, will not participate as they have already secured qualification for the 2021 AFC Cup.

Quarter-finals
In the quarter-finals, the matchups were decided by draw:
Match 1: 8th vs 3rd
Match 2: 7th vs 4th
Match 3: 6th vs 5th

The matches, originally scheduled for 9 October, will be played on 16 October.

Semi-finals
The semi-finals were played on 19 October 2020 after originally being scheduled for 12 October 2020.

Final
The 2020 Kyrgyzstan Cup was played on 22 October 2020 after originally being scheduled for 15 October 2020.

Goal scorers

3 goals:
 Maksat Alygulov - Abdysh-Ata

2 goals:

 Kelvin Inkoom - Alay Osh
 Joel Kojo - Alay Osh

1 goals:

 Bakhtiyar Duyshobekov - Abdysh-Ata
 Eldiyar Sardarbekov - Abdysh-Ata
 Erlan Mashirapov - Alay Osh
 Ermek Niyazaliev - Kara-Balta
 Murolimzhon Akhmedov - Neftchi
 Umidillo Iminov - Neftchi
 Eldar Moldozhunusov - Neftchi

Own goals:
 Farhad Turdiev Kara-Balta against Abdysh-Ata

See also
2020 Kyrgyz Premier League

External links
Kyrgyzstan Football Union

References

Kyrgyzstan Cup seasons
Kyrgyzstan
Kyrgyzstan Cup